Peter Uhrig (born 23 May 1965) is a German lightweight rower. He won a gold medal at the 1989 World Rowing Championships in Bled with the lightweight men's quadruple scull. He competed at the 1996 Summer Olympics in lightweight double sculls and came eleventh.

References

1965 births
Living people
German male rowers
World Rowing Championships medalists for West Germany
World Rowing Championships medalists for Germany
Olympic rowers of Germany
Rowers at the 1992 Summer Olympics
Rowers at the 1996 Summer Olympics